List of rulers of  Pate

Located at Pate Island, Kenya.

{|
Term
Incumbent
Notes
|-
|1203||Pate sultanate independence from Kilwa Kisiwani
|-
|Mfalume  (Sultans)
|-
|Nabahani Dynasty
|-
|1688 to 1713||Bwana Mkuu, Mfalume
|-
|1713 to 17??||Bwana Tamu, Mfalume
|-
|1779 to 1809||Fumo Madi ibn Abi Bakr, Mfalume
|-
|1809 to 1813||Ahmad ibn Shaykh, Mfalume
|-
|1813 to 1818||Fumo Luti Kipunga ibn Fumo Madi, Mfalume
|-
|1818 to 18??||Fumo Luti ibn Ahmad, Mfalume
|-
|18?? to 1823||Bwana Shaykh ibn Fumo Madi, Mfalume  ||1st Term
|-
|1823 to 18??||Bwana Waziri ibn Bwana Tamu, Mfalume  ||1st Term
|-
|18?? to 18??||Bwana Shaykh ibn Fumo Madi, Mfalume  ||2nd Term
|-
|18?? to 1830||Bwana Waziri ibn Bwana Tamu, Mfalume  ||2nd Term
|-
|1830 to 1840||Fumo Bakari ibn Shaykh, Mfalume
|-
|1840 to 1856||Ahmad ibn Fumo Bakari, Mfalume, see Wituland
|-
|1856 to 1858||Ahmad Simba Balla ibn Fumo Luti, Mfalume
|-
|... Dynasty
|-
|1858 to 1870||Shaykh Muhammad, Mfalume
|-
|1870||State abolished
|}

See also
Witu
List of Sunni Muslim dynasties

References

Martin, Chryssee MacCasler Perry and Esmond Bradley Martin:  Quest for the Past. An historical guide to the Lamu Archipelago. 1973. (p. 7) (only for Bwana Mkuu, Bwana Tamu and Fumo Madi ibn Abi Bakr)

Pate
Pate, Rulers
Pate, Rulers
Pate, Rulers
Pate
People from Lamu Archipelago